Diana Ewing (born ) is an American actress.

Early years 
Ewing was born in Honolulu. In her teenage years, she acted in plays at Punahou School and Honolulu Community Theater. She is the daughter of William H. Ewing and Marjorie A. Ewing. Her father was a newspaper editorial consultant, and she worked at a newspaper during the summers of her high-school years. She attended Sarah Lawrence College.

Career 
Ewing acted at the Manhattan Playhouse in East Palo Alto, California. Productions in which she performed included The Master Builder and Slow Dance on the Killing Ground.

Ewing guest-starred on many television series, including The Mod Squad (1968), Love American Style  (1969), Mission: Impossible (1969), The Big Valley (1969), The F.B.I.  (1970), Archer (1975), Washington: Behind Closed Doors (1977), Harry O (1974), and The Rockford Files (1977). One of her earliest television roles was in the original Star Trek in the third-season episode "The Cloud Minders" (1969) as Droxine.

Ewing made her feature film debut in the supporting role of Tracy Rutledge, in the movie 80 Steps to Jonah (1969), and also appeared in Play It As It Lays (1972) and The Way We Were (1973). Her last appearance on the big screen was as Jenny in the western thriller Knife for the Ladies (1974). Her last television appearance was in Washington: Behind Closed Doors (1977).

Personal life
Ewing married Timothy Woolley Quealy on June 17, 1965. She was also later married to writer Charles Shyer.

Filmography

Film

Television

References

External links

 

Living people
American film actresses
American television actresses
Actresses from Honolulu
21st-century American women
Year of birth missing (living people)
American stage actresses
1940s births